Kongorong is a locality in the Australian state of South Australia located southwest of Mount Gambier. It has an Australian rules football team and netball team. Kongorong Primary School had 61 students in 2010.

The 2016 Australian census which was conducted in August 2016 reports that Kongorong had a population of 193 people.

History
Kongorong was officially named by the South Australian Government on 30 March 1922 for the cadastral land division in which the township lay, the Hundred of Kongorong. Kongorong is thought to mean "the corner of it" in an indigenous language.

Economy

Kongorong is a service town for the surrounding community involved in dairy and sheep farming, timber plantations, and grape growing in the Mount Gambier wine region.

Governance
Kongorong is located within the federal division of Barker, the state electoral district of Mount Gambier and the local government area of the District Council of Grant.

References

Towns in South Australia
Limestone Coast